Suttons Corner is an unincorporated community in Clay County, in the U.S. state of Georgia.

History
Suttons Corner was founded by Warren Sutton, and named for him. Suttons Corner Museum in Fort Gaines contains relics of the history of Suttons Corner.

Geography
Suttons Corner is located in the eastern part of Clay County, and is served by U.S. Route 27 and Georgia State Route 37.

References

Unincorporated communities in Clay County, Georgia
Unincorporated communities in Georgia (U.S. state)